Koksha is a valley that is located in Badakhshan's Kuran Wa Munjan District in Afghanistan.  Koksha is famous for its lapis lazuli found in the mines of Sar-e-Sang since the 3rd millennium BC.  Koksha Valley includes Mount Ladjuar.  The main river is the Koksha River, the tributary in the valley.  Parts of the valley are also found in Jurm District.

References 

Badakhshan Province
Valleys of Afghanistan
Mines